Abrakebabra Investments Ltd. or AIL Group is a company behind a group of Irish fastfood franchises. The history of the group goes back to 1982 when the first Abrakebabra was opened in Rathmines, Dublin.

Portfolio
The AIL Group operates a number of different franchise formulas in the Republic of Ireland and UK. It has over 180 outlets across their different brands and was voted 'Irish Franchise of the Year' in 2008/2009 and again in 2016 by the Irish Franchise Association.

Abrakebabra
Abrakebabra is a fast-food restaurant offering a wide selection of kebabs, burgers, loaded fries, baguettes and sides. Restaurants are located all over Ireland, on the high street, shopping centres and more recently in Maxol fuel stations.
Most restaurants are eat-in or take-away but there are a few outlets that also offer delivery.

Bagel Factory
The Bagel Factory was created in 1996 and the first shop opened in 1997 as "Great American Bagel Factory". This first shop was in Endell Street in London. Initially not set up as a franchise formula: the first shop had a bakery in the basement, the shop on ground level and the owner living in the apartment above the shop. In now trades as just Bagel Factory and has 26 outlets in Central London, Reading, Edinburgh, Dublin and some major travel hubs in both countries.

Chick King
Chick King is an Irish-based franchise formula. As part of the AIL Group the official head-office is at the AIL address in Rathmines, Dublin but actual operations are led from Newbridge, County Kildare. In 2008 it was voted as 'Best Emerging Franchise' by the Irish Franchise Association.

O'Briens Sandwich Cafés
O'Briens operates over 100 outlets all around the republic. Many of the stores also offer catering services and it also has some stores in offices that are not open to the public (for example at KPMG office at St. Stephens Green in Dublin. The concept is offering 'made to order' sandwiches and also offers the portfolio from sister-company Bagel Factory.

Former brands

Yo Sushi
YO! Sushi brought the Japanese style of kaiten sushi bars to the UK: delivering the freshly made sushis via a small conveyor belt that travels at 8 cm/s and customer sitting at the bar can just pick whatever they like from the belt. Yo! was the first company to bring this method to the UK market in 1997. AIL operates the Irish franchise organisation, the companies worldwide operations are managed through Yo!'s headquarters in London.

All Irish operations had ceased by 2017.

Gourmet Burger Kitchen
Gourmet Burger Kitchen, sometimes shortened to GBK, is originally a concept from New Zealand. As of June 2013, it operates 7 outlets in the republic: 5 in Dublin, one at Dublin Airport and one in Newbridge.

AIL sold the franchise back to the parent company in 2016.

References

Companies of the Republic of Ireland
Holding companies established in 1982
Irish companies established in 1982
Holding companies of Ireland